Alonso Napoleon Valdéz Prado (born 23 January 1978) is a Peruvian Olympic show jumping rider. He competed at the 2016 Summer Olympics in Rio de Janeiro, Brazil, where he finished 56th in the individual competition, collecting 22 penalties in total during the first two qualification rounds. Alonso became the first Peruvian equestrian to compete at the Olympics since 1984, and the first one to compete in show jumping.

Valdez participated at the 2014 World Equestrian Games, where he placed 97th individually. He also participated at several regional games, including the 2015 Pan American Games.

References

Living people
1978 births
Peruvian male equestrians
Equestrians at the 2016 Summer Olympics
Equestrians at the 2015 Pan American Games
Olympic equestrians of Peru
Equestrians at the 2019 Pan American Games
Pan American Games competitors for Peru